George Percy (1580-1627) was a high-born Englishman who was a colonist in Jamestown, Virginia.

George Percy may also refer to:
George Percy, Earl Percy (b.1984), heir apparent to the Dukedom of Northumberland
George Percy, 5th Duke of Northumberland (1778–1867), British Tory politician known as The Earl of Beverley
George W. Percy (1847-1900), American architect in San Francisco